The Micropezidae are a moderate-sized family of acalyptrate muscoid flies in the insect order Diptera, comprising about 500 species in about 50 genera and five subfamilies worldwide, (except New Zealand and Macquarie Island). They are most diverse in tropical and subtropical habitats, especially in the Neotropical Region.

Insects in this family are commonly called stilt-legged flies, after their characteristically long legs. The fore legs are markedly smaller than the other pairs. Mostly, they are long-bodied, often black flies, usually with infuscated (darkened) wings. Wings are reduced in the genera Calycopteryx and entirely absent in the ant-like Badisis ambulans.

Description
For terms see Morphology of Diptera
Very slender,  small to large (3–16 mm) flies, they have long, thin legs and narrow wings. The head is small and  elongated or rounded. The antennae are small  and the arista is bare or pubescent. Ocelli are present, but ocellar bristles are absent. Vibrissae are absent and the postvertical bristles are divergent or absent. Up to three pairs of frontal bristles curve forward or backward. Interfrontal bristles are absent. The wings are clear or have a smoky pattern. The costa is without interruptions. The subcosta is complete, its ending in the costa close to vein R1. The posterior basal wing cell and discoidal wing cell are sometimes fused. Crossvein BM-Cu present or (Micropezinae) absent. The abdomen is long and narrow. The tibiae lack a dorsal preapical bristle.

Biology

Some species, much the same as in the strongylophthalmyiid genus, Strongylophthalmyia, mimic ants; others mimic wasps and are especially similar in appearance to some ichneumonid wasps. Species of the genus Anaeropsis have stalked eyes.

Little is known of the larval habits, but they are probably phytophagous or saprophagous in decayed vegetation, old manure, or fungi. Larvae of certain Mimegralla species have been found to live in the roots of ginger and other plants, under the bark of dead trees, or in other decaying material. Species of Micropeza have phytophagous larvae feeding in the root nodules of leguminous plants in open habitats. Species of Rainieria develop in rotting wood and are found in old forests. Adults are either predatory on small insects (for example Calobata in Britain) or are attracted to excrement or decaying fruit. Adults are found on low herbage, flowers, leaves, rotting fruit, and excrement.

Many species (for example those of genus Mimegralla) are known for their habit of standing motionless while waving their prominently marked front legs in front of their heads, a behavior which contributes to their mimicry of wasps. At least one species of Metopochetus (M. curvus) was observed to wave its hind legs instead, though these are not conspicuously colored.

Identification
Czerny. 1930. Tylidae. In: Lindner, E. (Ed.). Die Fliegen der Paläarktischen Region 5, 42a, 13–16. Keys to Palaearctic species but now needs revision (in German).
Séguy, E. (1934) Diptères: Brachycères. II. Muscidae acalypterae, Scatophagidae. Paris: Éditions Faune de France 28. virtuelle numérique
Shtakel'berg, A.A. Family Micropezidae (Tylidae in part)  in  Bei-Bienko, G. Ya, 1988 Keys to the insects of the European Part of the USSR Volume 5 (Diptera) Part 2 English edition. Keys to Palaearctic species but now needs revision.

Conservation
Calycopteryx mosleyi, found on the Kerguelen Islands and Heard Island, is associated with the Kerguélen cabbage (Pringlea antiscorbutica, Brassicaceae). As this plant is being destroyed by introduced rabbits, the fly is considered vulnerable.

The larvae of Badisis ambulans live in the pitchers of the endangered Albany pitcher plant (Cephalotus follicularis, Cephalotaceae).

Fossil record
Several fossil species have been found in Baltic amber, probably from the Late Eocene (about 36 million years old). However, most were washed onto beaches after wearing from Tertiary strata, making their age uncertain.
Two fossil genera are presently recognized, Cypselosomatites Hennig, 1965 and the advanced Electrobata Hennig, 1965 which may be more than one genus however.

Genera
This list is compiled from the BioSystematic Database of World Diptera and probably complete as of January 2007.

Anaeropsis Bigot, 1866
Badisis McAlpine, 1990
Calobata Meigen, 1803
Calobatella Mik, 1898
Calobatina Enderlein, 1922
Calosphen Hennig, 1934
Calycopteryx Eaton, 1875
Cardiacephala Macquart, 1843
Cephalosphen Hennig, 1934
Chaetotylus Hendel, 1932
Cliobata Enderlein, 1923
Cnodacophora Czerny, 1930
Compsobata Czerny, 1930
Cothornobata Czerny, 1932
Courtoisia Barraclough, 1993
Crepidochetus Enderlein, 1922
Crosa Steyskal, 1952
Cryogonus Cresson, 1926
Ectemnodera Enderlein, 1922
Electrobata Hennig, 1965
Erythromyiella Hennig, 1935
Eurybata Osten Sacken, 1882
Globomyia Hennig, 1935
Globopeza Marshall, 2005
Glyphodera Enderlein, 1922
Grallipeza Rondani, 1850
Grammicomyia Bigot, 1859
Hemichaeta Hennig, 1934
Hoplocheiloma Cresson, 1926
Mesoconius Enderlein, 1922
Metasphen Frey, 1927
Metopochetus Enderlein, 1922
Micropeza Meigen, 1803
Mimegralla Rondani, 1850
Mimomyrmecia Frey, 1927
Neograllomyia Hendel, 1933
Neria Robineau-Desvoidy, 1830
Nestima Osten Sacken, 1881
Notenthes Marshall, 2002
Papeza McAlpine, 1975
Paramimegralla Hennig, 1937
Parasphen Enderlein, 1922
Plocoscelus Enderlein, 1922
Poecilotylus Hennig, 1934
Pseudeurybata Hennig, 1934
Ptilosphen Enderlein, 1922
Rainieria Rondani, 1843
Scipopus Enderlein, 1922
Steyskalia Aczel, 1959
Stiltissima Barraclough, 1991
Taeniaptera Macquart, 1835
Tenthes Cresson, 1930
Trepidarioides Frey, 1927
Zelatractodes Enderlein, 1922

References

Further reading

Andersson, H., 1989 Taxonomic notes on the Fennoscandian Micropezidae.Notulae Entomologicae, 69:153–162.
Brown, B. V., A. Borkent, J.M. Cumming, D.M. Wood, N.E. Woodley, and M. Zumbado. 2010.  Manual of Central American Diptera, Volume 2.  NRC Research Press.
Hennig, W. 1934. Revision der Tyliden (Dipt., Acalypt.). I. Teil: die Taeniapterinae Amerikas [part]. Stett. Entomol. Ztg. 95: 65–108, 294–330. [Publication split:. 65–108;. 294–330. Concludes in Hennig, 1935b.]
Hennig, W. 1935a. Revision der Tyliden (Dipt., Acalypt.). II. Teil: die ausseramerikanischen Taeniapterinae, die Trepidariinae und Tylinae. Allgemeines über die Tyliden. Zugleich ein Beitrag zu den Ergebnissen der Sunda-expedition Rensch, 1927 [part]. Konowia 14: 68–92.
Hennig, W. 1935b. Revision der Tyliden (Dipt., Acalypt.). I. Teil: die Taeniapterinae Amerikas [concl.]. Stett. Entomol. Ztg. 96: 27–67.
Hennig, W. 1935c. Revision der Tyliden (Dipt., Acalypt.). II. Teil: die ausseramerikanischen Taeniapterinae, die Trepidariinae und Tylinae. Allgemeines über die Tyliden. Zugleich ein Beitrag zu den Ergebnissen der Sunda-expedition Rensch, 1927 [part]. Konowia 14: 192–216, 289–310. [Publication split:. 192–216; 289–310. Concludes in Hennig, 1936.]
Hennig, W. 1936. Revision der Tyliden (Dipt., Acalypt.). II. Teil: die ausseramerikanischen Taeniapterinae, die Trepidariinae und Tylinae. Allgemeines über die Tyliden. Zugleich ein Beitrag zu den Ergebnissen der Sunda-expedition Rensch, 1927 [concl.]. Konowia 15: 129–44, 201–39. [Publication split:. 129–44;. 201–39. ]
McAlpine, D.K., 1975. The subfamily classification of the Micropezidae and the genera of Eurybatinae (Diptera: Schizophora). Journal of Entomology (B) 43: 231–245.
Steyskal, G.C. 1952b. Australasian stilt-legged flies (Diptera: Tylidae) in the United States National Museum. Proc. U.S. Natl. Mus. 102 [= No. 3294): 161–80. (26 February)
Steyskal, G.C. 1964. Larvae of Micropezidae (Diptera), including two species that bore in ginger roots. Ann. Entomol. Soc. Am. 57: 292–96. (15 May)
Steyskal, G.C. 1977a. Family Micropezidae (Tylidae),. 12–20. In: Delfinado, M.D. & D.E. Hardy, eds., A catalog of the Diptera of the Oriental Region. Volume III. Suborder Cyclorrhapha (excluding Division Aschiza). University Press of Hawaii, Honolulu. x + 854 p.
Verbeke, J. 1951. Taenapterinae (Diptera:Cyclorrhapha) Fam. Micropezidae. Explor. Parc. natn. Albert Miss. G.F. de Witte 72:1–106.

External links

Family Micropezidae at EOL
Stilt-legged fly diagnostic photographs
Key to U.S.A. Micropezidae
European (including Russia) species list
Nearctic (North America) species list
BugGuide Images at BugGuide
Images at Diptera.info

 
Brachycera families
Articles containing video clips